Casas de Don Antonio is a municipality in the province of Cáceres and autonomous community of Extremadura, Spain.

References

Municipalities in the Province of Cáceres